Eulimella trewae is a species of sea snail, a marine gastropod mollusk in the family Pyramidellidae, the pyrams and their allies.

The epithet "trewae" refers to Mrs A. Trew who is the curator in charge of the molluscan collection at the National Museum Cardiff

Description
The length of the shell varies between 2.7 mm and 3.5 mm. The white shell has a conical shape with a spiral microstructure and with a blunt top. The protoconch is helicoid. The teleoconch contains six to seven flat whorls with a relatively deep suture and a few axial folds. The inner part of the outer lip is smooth. The umbilicus is lacking.

Distribution
This species occurs in the Atlantic Ocean off Mauritania at depths between 26 mm and 200m.

References

External links
 To Encyclopedia of Life
 To World Register of Marine Species

trewae
Gastropods described in 2000